Agbalépédogan is a northern suburb of Lomé, Togo. It is one of the educational areas of the city and a number of colleges and schools are located in Agbalépédogan.

Lomé
Populated places in Maritime Region